Castilleja indivisa, commonly known as Texas Indian paintbrush or entireleaf Indian paintbrush, is a hemiparasitic annual wildflower native to Texas, Louisiana, and Oklahoma in the United States. There are historical records of the species formerly growing in Arkansas, and reports of naturalized populations in Florida and Alabama.

The bright red leaf-like bracts surrounding the white to greenish flowers make the plant look like a ragged brush dipped in red paint. They sometimes produce a light yellow or pure white variation mixed in with the reds.

Each plant typically grows  in height. The leaves are long and stalkless. The roots grow until they reach the roots of other plants, mainly grasses, and then penetrate the roots of the "host" plant to obtain a portion of their needed nutrients (known as semi- or hemiparasitic).

Texas paintbrush typically blooms in early to mid-spring and thrives in well-drained areas with full sun. They can be seen along highways and in fields, complementing the deep blue of the bluebonnets.

References

 Texas A&M University Texas Paintbrush
 University of Texas, Images of Castilleja indivisa
 Wild Seed Farms, Growing Instructions for Texas Paint Brush

External links
Photo of herbarium specimen at Missouri Botanical Garden, collected in Republic of Texas in 1844

indivisa
Plants described in 1845
Flora of the United States